Alte Wöhr is a station on the Hamburg-Altona link line and served by the trains of Hamburg S-Bahn lines S1 and S11. The station is also known as Alte Wöhr (Stadtpark), due to its proximity to Hamburg Stadtpark. It was opened in 1931 and is located in the Hamburg district of Barmbek-Nord, Germany. Barmbek-Nord is part of the borough of Hamburg-Nord.

History 
The station was opened in 1931, then by the name "Alte Wöhr Stadtpark".

Service 
The lines S1 and S11 of Hamburg S-Bahn call at Alte Wöhr station.

Gallery

See also 

 Hamburger Verkehrsverbund (HVV)
 List of Hamburg S-Bahn stations

References

External links 

 Line and route network plans at hvv.de 

Hamburg S-Bahn stations in Hamburg
Buildings and structures in Hamburg-Nord
Railway stations in Germany opened in 1931